The enzyme leukotriene-C4 synthase (EC 4.4.1.20) catalyzes the reaction 

leukotriene C4  leukotriene A4 + glutathione

This enzyme belongs to the family of lyases, specifically the class of carbon-sulfur lyases.  The systematic name of this enzyme class is leukotriene-C4 glutathione-lyase (leukotriene-A4-forming). Other names in common use include leukotriene C4 synthetase, LTC4 synthase, LTC4 synthetase, leukotriene A4:glutathione S-leukotrienyltransferase, (7E,9E,11Z,14Z)-(5S,6R)-5,6-epoxyicosa-7,9,11,14-tetraenoate:glutathione leukotriene-transferase, (epoxide-ring-opening), (7E,9E,11Z,14Z)-(5S,6R)-6-(glutathion-S-yl)-5-hydroxyicosa-7,9,11,14-tetraenoate glutathione-lyase (epoxide-forming).  This enzyme participates in arachidonic acid metabolism.

Structural studies

References

 
 
 
 

EC 4.4.1
Enzymes of known structure